Richard Dean Carelli (born November 9, 1954) is a retired American race car driver from Arvada, Colorado. He was nicknamed the "High Plains Drifter". He won multiple times in the No. 6 NASCAR Craftsman Truck Series truck. He is the spotter for Erik Jones in the NASCAR Cup Series.

Racing career

Carelli won the NASCAR Southwest Tour championship in 1991 and won 21 times in the series during his career. He joined the NASCAR Winston West Series in 1992, and he was named the series Rookie of the Year. He returned to the series in 1993, capturing the series championship and Most Popular Driver award. He has won nine times in that series.

He was one of the original drivers in the Craftsman Truck Series, starting at the series' first race at Phoenix in 1995. Carelli raced every series race until he suffered near-fatal injuries when his truck hit the wall during a race at Memphis Motorsports Park in 1999. He suffered a basilar skull fracture, damaged his carotid artery and sinus. He recovered and returned to race the entire 2000 season. He won another race at Richmond International Raceway in 2000 with an underfunded team that he was the crew chief for. He also made 9 Winston Cup starts from 1992 to 1994. He stopped driving in 2004 and moved into the administrative side of motorsport.

After retiring from driving, he later became the team manager for Kevin Harvick Incorporated – a position that he held when Ron Hornaday won the 2007 championship. He later worked with NTS Motorsports as the team general manager. Carelli was also the spotter for the Stewart-Haas Racing No. 41, driven by Kurt Busch after first working with him at Furniture Row Racing; FRR's general manager Joe Garone was Carelli's crew chief from 1989 to 1994. He later became Erik Jones' spotter at FRR before following him to Joe Gibbs Racing and Richard Petty Motorsports.

Awards
Carelli was inducted in the West Coast Stock Car Hall of Fame in 2009 along with Wayne Spears, Doug George, and Chuck Bown.

Motorsports career results

NASCAR
(key) (Bold – Pole position awarded by qualifying time. Italics – Pole position earned by points standings or practice time. * – Most laps led.)

Winston Cup Series

Busch Series

Craftsman Truck Series

Winston West Series

ARCA Re/Max Series
(key) (Bold – Pole position awarded by qualifying time. Italics – Pole position earned by points standings or practice time. * – Most laps led.)

24 Hours of Daytona 
(key)

References

External links
 

Living people
1955 births
People from Arvada, Colorado
Racing drivers from Colorado
Racing drivers from Denver
NASCAR drivers
ARCA Menards Series drivers
American Speed Association drivers
Sportspeople from the Denver metropolitan area